Mylothra is a genus of moths in the family Autostichidae.

Species
Mylothra christophi Gozmány, 1967
Mylothra creseritis Meyrick, 1907
Mylothra forsteri (Gozmany, 1963)
Mylothra maga (Gozmany, 1963)
Mylothra mithra (Gozmany, 1963)
Mylothra mithridates (Gozmany, 1963)
Mylothra persica (Gozmany, 1963)
Mylothra pyrrhella (Ragonot, 1895)
Mylothra sahname (Gozmany, 1963)
Mylothra satrapa (Gozmany, 1963)
Mylothra sheherezade (Gozmany, 1963)
Mylothra sindbad (Gozmany, 1963)
Mylothra turana (Caradja, 1920)

References

 
Symmocinae